Rob Daviau is an American game designer known for creating legacy board gaming.

Career 
He has guest lectured at Massachusetts Institute of Technology, Carnegie Mellon University, and New York University on game design and has been a visiting professor of game design at Hampshire College. In 1998, Daviau joined Hasbro as a writer for text-heavy games like Trivial Pursuit and Taboo.

Daviau is a co-founder of Restoration Games which "specializes in resurrecting older games and giving them new life".

Bibliography 
Games that Rob Daviau has designed or co-designed include the following:
2000 Star Wars: The Queen's Gambit with Alan Roach and Craig Van Ness (2001 International Gamers Award winner for General Strategy, 2-Player category)
2001 Axis & Allies: Pacific with Stephen Baker and Larry Harris, Jr. (2001 Origins Awards Best Historical Board Game Winner)
2001 Risk 2210 A.D. with Craig Van Ness (2001 Origins Awards Best Science Fiction or Fantasy Board Game Winner)
2004 Betrayal at House on the Hill with Mike Selinker, Bruce Glassco, Bill McQuillan, and Teeuwynn Woodruff (2004 Origins Awards Gamers' Choice Award Winner; 2005 Japan Boardgame Prize Best Advanced Game Nominee)
2004 Heroscape Master Set: Rise of the Valkyrie with Stephen Baker and Craig Van Ness 
2011 Risk Legacy with Chris Dupuis (2012 Golden Geek Best Innovative Board Game Winner)
2015 Pandemic Legacy: Season 1 with Matt Leacock (2015 Golden Geek Board Game of the Year Winner; 2016 SXSW Tabletop Game of the Year Winner; 2016 Dragon Awards Best Science Fiction or Fantasy Board Game Winner)
2016 SeaFall with JR Honeycutt
2017 Pandemic Legacy: Season 2 with Matt Leacock (2018 Spiel des Jahres Special Prize Winner)
2018 Betrayal Legacy with Avalon Hill
2021 Return to Dark Tower with Isaac Childres and Restoration Games.
2022 Dragonlance: Warriors of Krynn [upcoming] with Stephen Baker

References

External links
 Rob Daviau: boardgamegeek.com designer entry

Board game designers
Living people
Year of birth missing (living people)